GMS (GMS) is a commercial mail and groupware server developed by Gordano Ltd. It runs on Windows, Linux, Solaris, and AIX. Originally called NTMail which was the first commercially available mail for the Windows platform, the products were rebranded to the Gordano Messaging Suite in August 2002 to reflect the support for additional hardware platforms and operating systems.

Features 

The features of GMS include encrypted access using SSL, anti-virus and anti-spam protection, over-the-air handheld synchronization,  web based webmail and calendaring interfaces and a plugin for Microsoft Outlook allowing Microsoft Exchange style functionality.

Administration is performed by a web browser using HTTP

Supported clients

Groupware 
Native support for full groupware features exists for these clients:
 GMS WebMail, which supports Internet Explorer, Firefox and Safari
 Microsoft Outlook by using an Outlook plugin (both online and offline) 
 Mobile devices Apple iPhone, Windows Mobile, Palm Treo, Symbian and BlackBerry using over-the-air synchronization
 Windows Calendar on Windows Vista
 Mozilla Sunbird
 Apple iCal

Mail only 
 All standard mail clients IMAP, SMTP, POP3
 GMS WebMail
 GMS WebMail Mobile on mobile devices
 WAP

References 

Reviews of version 15:
 CRN Review: E-mail Options For Small Business
 PC Pro Review: Gordano Messaging Suite 15

External links
 Official homepage

Groupware
Message transfer agents
Solaris software
Windows Internet software
Internet software for Linux